Ellwood as a given name. Notable people with the name include:

Ellwood Patterson Cubberley (1868–1941), American educator and author
Ellwood Godfrey (1910–90), American field hockey player
Ellwood Madill (1915–99), Canadian politician

See also 

 Ellwood (surname)

Given names
English masculine given names